The 1981 Nippon Professional Baseball season was the 32nd season of operation for the league.

Regular season standings

Central League

Pacific League

Pacific League Playoff
The Pacific League teams with the best first and second-half records met in a best-of-five playoff series to determine the league representative in the Japan Series.

Nippon-Ham Fighters won the series 3–1–1.

Japan Series

Yomiuri Giants won the series 4–2.

See also
1981 Major League Baseball season

References

1981 in baseball
1981 in Japanese sport